Sandor Clegane, nicknamed the Hound, is a fictional character in the A Song of Ice and Fire series of fantasy novels by American author George R. R. Martin, and its television adaptation Game of Thrones.

Introduced in 1996's A Game of Thrones, Sandor is the estranged younger brother of Ser Gregor Clegane, from the fictional Seven Kingdoms of Westeros. Sandor serves as King Joffrey Baratheon's personal bodyguard. He subsequently appeared in Martin's A Clash of Kings (1998), A Storm of Swords (2000), and A Feast for Crows (2005). Like his brother, Sandor is regarded as one of the fiercest and strongest fighters in the Seven Kingdoms. His face is marked by gruesome facial burns he received as a child when his brother shoved his face into a brazier; ever since he has retained a crippling fear of fire, as well as a fierce hatred for his brother. While initially appearing brutal and fatalistic, he later proves to be far more honorable, sympathetic and compassionate, particularly through his relationships with Sansa and Arya Stark.

Sandor is portrayed by Scottish actor Rory McCann in the HBO television adaptation. McCann also narrates the animated "History and Lore" for House Clegane, available in the bonus material on the Blu Ray releases.

Character description 
Sandor Clegane, known also as The Hound, is the younger brother of Gregor Clegane, and was a retainer to House Lannister. He was regarded as one of the most dangerous and skilled fighters in Westeros. His size (in the novels he is 6'8", or 2 m and over 300 lbs, or 140 kg) and strength makes him an imposing figure, though he is not even as large as his brother Gregor. His visage is distinguished by gruesome burn scars that he received as a child, when his brother forced his head into a brazier. Consequently, Clegane fears fire and hates his brother. He is cynical and scornful of a knight's vows and their code of honor, as Gregor is a brutal knight utterly devoid of any morality or even humanity, a sadist who delights and revels in rape, bloodshed and violence. Clegane was described as a tormented man, driven by anger and hate, suffering from childhood post-traumatic stress disorder and obsessed with killing his brother.

Storylines

Novels 

Sandor Clegane is not a point of view character in the novels, so his actions are witnessed mainly through the eyes of Sansa and Arya Stark, with some narrations from other characters such as Ned Stark and Tyrion Lannister.

A Game of Thrones and A Clash of Kings

In A Game of Thrones, he acts as bodyguard and servant to Crown Prince Joffrey Baratheon, who calls him "Dog" but is somewhat attached to him, as Joffrey lacks a father figure from King Robert.  While escorting Sansa home, he reveals to her how his face was scarred and expresses much resentment of his brutish older brother and towards the concept of knighthood in general. Clegane hunts down Arya Stark's friend Mycah, and leads the Lannister attack on Eddard Stark's men in the Tower of the Hand during the purge of the Starks.

Sandor is named Joffrey's Kingsguard towards the end of A Game of Thrones, but always refuses to become a Knight. Clegane is often assigned to guard Sansa, and becomes quite protective of her, calling her "little bird." He tries to protect her from Joffrey's abuse in A Clash of Kings, and advising her to do whatever Joffrey tells her as the best method of survival. He saves Sansa's life when Joffrey's entourage is set upon by his own impoverished citizens, in the streets of King's Landing. Sandor becomes disillusioned during the Battle of the Blackwater and abandons his duty as Joffrey's guard due to the widespread use of wildfire (a fictional incendiary substance inspired by Greek fire). He offers to help Sansa flee King's Landing, and is agitated when she refuses. He threatens her but then calms down after she sings him a song about mercy, before fleeing the capital on his own.

A Storm of Swords

In A Storm of Swords, the lordless Sandor gets drunk and is captured by the Brotherhood Without Banners, who sentences him to a trial by combat on a charge of murder accused by Arya.  Sandor prevails against the Brotherhood leader Beric Dondarrion and is set free.  He later kidnaps Arya and hopes to ransom her to her brother Robb Stark at Riverrun in order to earn a place in Robb's service.  He takes her to the Twins, where Robb is attending the wedding of his uncle.  However, just as they arrive, the Red Wedding happens and the Freys begin slaughtering the Starks.  Sandor knocks Arya unconscious to prevent her from running into the castle and fights his way out, killing three Frey knights.  They later encounter three of Gregor's men — Polliver, Tickler and a pimply squire from House Sarsfield — at the Crossroad Inn.  Sandor is provoked while drunken and kills Polliver in the ensuing altercation, but is seriously injured. He becomes critically ill when his wounds begin to fester, so Arya abandons him under a tree to await his apparent death.

A Feast for Crows

He is mentioned a few times in A Feast for Crows (2005), because stories are spreading that somebody using the Hound's helmet is committing atrocities. But the Elder Brother mentions to Brienne of Tarth that he found Sandor moribund, and is now "at rest", so his helmet was doubtless stolen from his graveyard. However, the appearance of a mute gravedigger who matches Sandor physically and the Elder Brother's refusal to confirm if Sandor is dead imply that he may still be alive.
As for the Hound's helmet, it is after revealed to Brienne and Podrick that it was Rorge and his criminal band who took it. And when the two of them are captured by the Brotherhood Without Banners and Rorge's band is killed, Lem decides to keep the helmet for himself, despite Thoros' opposition.

TV adaptation
Scottish actor Rory McCann has received acclaim for his portrayal of Sandor Clegane in the television adaptation of the series of books.

Season 1
Clegane is first introduced in the pilot episode when he accompanies the royal court on Robert Baratheon's visit to Winterfell. On the return trip to King's Landing, Joffrey falsely accuses a butcher's boy, Mycah, of having attacked him with a sword, and so Clegane must hunt the fugitive boy down, attracting the hatred of Mycah's friend Arya Stark. Weeks later, during the Tourney of the Hand, Sandor's brutally sadistic brother, Gregor, tries to kill Ser Loras Tyrell for unhorsing him, but Sandor intervenes, saving Loras' life. 
When Ned Stark reveals that Joffrey is a bastard born of incest, Clegane assists the Lannister soldiers in the subsequent purge of the Stark household and Sansa Stark's capture, although he later comforts Sansa when Joffrey torments her and advises how to avoid future pain. With Joffrey's ascension to the throne, Clegane is named to the Kingsguard to replace the ousted Ser Barristan Selmy.

Season 2
Sandor Clegane continues to defend Sansa, covering her after Joffrey has her humiliated and stripped in front of the assembled royal court. His humanity and underlying compassion are briefly revealed when he rescues Sansa from a fatal gang-rape, during a King's Landing street riot. But when Sansa thanks him and praises his bravery, he curtly brushes aside her gratitude, cynically professing, "Killing is the sweetest thing there is. Your father was a killer, your brothers are killers. Your betrothed, the king, is a killer."
He is one of the more effective leaders at the Battle of the Blackwater against Stannis Baratheon's shore forces, but is visibly shaken by fire "If any of those flaming fucking arrows come near me, I'll strangle you with your own guts" and horrified by the wildfire that incinerates much of Stannis' fleet. He ultimately deserts the battle and city after losing half of his men and witnessing some burned alive, "Fuck the kings guard. Fuck the city. Fuck the king." Before he leaves King's Landing, in a drunken stupor, he offers to take Sansa north to Winterfell, but she declines.

Season 3

In the Riverlands, Clegane is captured by the Brotherhood Without Banners, a group of knights and soldiers sent by Eddard Stark (in season 1) to stop Gregor and restore order to the Riverlands. At a rustic inn, while being transported, he notices and reveals Arya Stark's true identity to them. At the Brotherhood's cave hideout, he is accused and tried via combat against their leader, Lord Beric Dondarrion; although Clegane asserts that any killings, even running down Mycah, the butcher's son, were committed in protection of Prince Joffrey, "I was (his) sworn shield. My place is not to question princes". Despite Beric's flaming sword, Sandor secures his freedom, dealing a fatal blow to Lord Beric, who is then immediately resurrected by the Red Priest, Thoros of Myr. Accusing them of thievery, as they will not now return his gold, days later, Clegane, still in the area, kidnaps a fleeing Arya, intending to ransom her to Robb Stark, at the wedding of Edmure Tully and Roslin Frey. However, they arrive at the Twins, just as the Freys unfold their  "Red Wedding" plot, and Clegane and Arya barely escape the ensuing bloody massacre.

Season 4
With the rest of House Stark believed dead and the Riverlands now under the rule of House Frey, Clegane decides to ransom Arya to her aunt Lysa Arryn in the Vale. During their journey, Arya reveals to Clegane that she has not forgiven him for killing Mycah and has vowed to kill him. The duo arrive in the Vale to find that Lysa has ostensibly committed suicide. Returning from the Bloody Gate, they encounter the sworn sword to Arya's mother Catelyn, Brienne of Tarth, who had promised to take the Stark children to safety. When Arya refuses to go with Brienne, Brienne and Clegane engage in single combat that culminates in Brienne's knocking Clegane off a cliff, gravely wounding him. Although Clegane begs Arya to kill him, she leaves him to die.

Season 6
It is revealed that Clegane survived; he had been discovered by Ray, a warrior turned septon. Clegane assists Ray and his followers in building a sept, but one day, after a brief journey into nearby woods to chop wood, Clegane returns to the community to find everyone slaughtered by rogue members of the Brotherhood Without Banners. Clegane takes up an ax to hunt down those responsible and kills four of them before discovering the remaining three about to be hanged by Lord Beric Dondarrion and Thoros of Myr, who inform him that the group were acting independently of the Brotherhood. Lord Beric allows Clegane to help hang two of the outlaws, followed by an offer to join the Brotherhood in their journey north to help Jon Snow and the Night's Watch fight the White Walkers.

Season 7
During their journey north, the Brotherhood stops at a farm owned by a farmer Clegane had previously robbed. Inside, they find the bodies of the farmer and his daughter. Remorseful, Clegane digs them a grave with Thoros's help. Thoros has Clegane look into the flames of the Brotherhood's campfire, and in them the skeptical Clegane sees the White Walkers and their forces marching towards the Wall.

The Brotherhood attempts to cross the Wall via Eastwatch-by-the-Sea, but are intercepted by wildling scouts manning the castle and are locked in the ice cells. Soon afterward, Jon Snow, Davos Seaworth, Jorah Mormont, and Gendry arrive at Eastwatch, intending to capture a wight to present to Cersei (now Queen of the Seven Kingdoms) as evidence the White Walkers exist. Clegane, Beric, and Thoros are released to accompany Jon, Jorah, Gendry, and the wilding Tormund Giantsbane beyond the Wall. The group soon captures a wight but is surrounded by the White Walkers and their army of wights, although not before Gendry flees to Eastwatch to request Daenerys Targaryen's aid. Daenerys arrives with her dragons before the group can be overrun. One dragon is killed and reanimated by the Night King, but Daenerys' group, minus Jon - who stays behind to fight back the White Walkers - are able to flee. Clegane joins Jon, Daenerys, and Davos as they sail to King's Landing.

At King's Landing, Clegane meets Brienne of Tarth. Despite their previous brutal fight, they converse on civil terms. Clegane learns that Arya is alive and with her family, prompting a rare smile. During the summit in the Dragon Pit outside King's Landing, Clegane confronts his brother and asks what they did to him then cuts off the answer and tells him he always knew who would come for him. Clegane brings out the trunk containing the wight, revealing to Cersei and Jaime Lannister the threat that lies beyond the wall. In the aftermath, Clegane sails to White Harbor with Daenerys' forces with the intention of travelling to Winterfell to aid Jon and Daenerys against the Night King.

Season 8
The Hound joins Daenerys, Jon, and their retinues as they march to Winterfell, where he is reunited with Arya and Sansa. The Hound and Arya make peace with one another before the dreaded Battle of Winterfell against the White Walkers. During the battle, the Hound is triggered by the use of fire to destroy the wights and is close to giving up, but is convinced by Beric to keep fighting, indicating towards Arya who is relentlessly fighting beside them.

The Hound then travels to King's Landing to kill his brother along with Arya, who intends to kill Cersei. The two infiltrate the Red Keep amongst a crowd of civilians Cersei is using as human shields, but Daenerys begins burning the city down and the Red Keep begins to crumble. The Hound urges Arya to leave as he goes to find his brother. Arya thanks him, calling him by his true name for the first and only time, and bids him farewell. A fight ensues between the Clegane brothers, and Sandor struggles to even injure his inhuman brother. Gregor is momentarily disarmed after the Hound stabs him through the head, and the Hound tackles him off a stairway into the inferno below, resulting in both of their deaths.

References 

A Song of Ice and Fire characters
Literary characters introduced in 1996
Fictional characters with disfigurements
Fictional characters with post-traumatic stress disorder
Fictional bodyguards
Fictional murderers of children
Fictional fratricides
Fictional murderers
Fictional nobility
Fictional revolutionaries
Fictional swordfighters
Fictional war veterans
Burn survivors in fiction
Male characters in literature
Male characters in television
Fictional suicides
Television characters introduced in 2011